Full Swing was a short-lived game show that combined general knowledge questions and the game of golf which aired on BBC1 for one series from 25 May to 27 July 1996. The programme was hosted by Jimmy Tarbuck with voice overs by Rosemarie Ford. The show was inspired by (and produced by the team behind) the BBC's popular Big Break, which featured snooker (and in turn, was influenced by ITV's long-running darts quiz, Bullseye). However, unlike the long-running Big Break and Bullseye, Full Swing did not catch on and only ran for one series.

Round 1: Three for the Tee

The contestant's celebrity guests use a golf simulator of famous golf courses. The celeb swings – the ball landing on the green or a hazard. The contestant is asked questions by cards. A correct answer gives a boost toward the pin.

Whichever 2 pairs gets closest to the pin goes through to round 2; the one who gets the least is eliminated and wins a consolation prize through a bonus game called Crazy Consolation.

Round 2: Fairway Or Foul

In this round, the contestant answers a question to make the celeb hit the ball to the green, however, there are hazards.

• bunkers or deep bunkers

• river and waterfalls

• rabbits digging holes

There is a special golf hole that the ball only goes into if it is lit up; if it is not lit, it ejects the golf ball back onto the green.

If it lands on any hazard, the contestant answers a hazard question – if they get it right, Tarbuck places the ball on the green for the contestant to putt in to the hole, if they get it wrong get another chance.

The winner was who putts the ball with the most remaining time or nearest to the pin. The losing contestant and their celebrity guest play a bonus round to win a cash consolation prize, called Celebrity Consolation.

Round 3: The Final Green

The contestant answers 4 general knowledge questions, getting them all right adds 40 seconds to the clock. Then a Bonus Ball is selected at random from a massive golf ball (similar to lottery machine). Each are numbered 10 to 60, and whichever one the contestant picks out, then it is added the time.

The celebrity guest then had to putt 10 golf balls into a hole within the time the contestant had accumulated, with the money rising from £100 to £1,000. Sinking all the balls in the hole wins the £1,000 jackpot, a holiday, if not they go away with the money they had won.

Ratings

The show aired on Saturdays in an early evening slot (similar to the Big Break slot) but was axed after just one series due to poor ratings. A Christmas Special was recorded but never broadcast, due to the disappointing reception of the first series – a move that angered host Tarbuck, who believed a slot over the festive period would have helped boost the show's reception by the public, and which saw him refuse to work for the BBC for several years after.

References

External links

BBC television game shows
1996 British television series debuts
1996 British television series endings
1990s British game shows